The Worshipful Company of Engineers is one of the livery companies of the City of London. The company was founded and became a livery company in 1983 and was incorporated by royal charter in 2004. The company is for chartered engineers of EC(UK) professional institutions or fellows of the Royal Academy of Engineering. It works to promote and develop all aspects of the science, art, and practice of engineering.

The Engineers' Company ranks ninety-fourth in the order of precedence for livery companies. Its motto is Certare Ingenio, Latin for Use Skills to the Best of One's Abilities. Its church is St Vedast-alias-Foster

Masters 
Since the formation of the Company in 1983

External links
 The Engineers' Company

References

Engineering societies based in the United Kingdom
Engineers
1983 establishments in England